1962 in philosophy

Events
Progressive utilization theory (PROUT) is fully outlined for the first time by Indian philosopher and spiritual leader Prabhat Ranjan Sarkar.
Perry Anderson takes over editorship of the New Left Review in the U.K., changing its emphasis to the theoretical.

Publications
 Geach, Peter. Reference and Generality. Cornell University Press.
 Kuhn, T. S. The Structure of Scientific Revolutions (1962)
 Leavis, F. R. Two Cultures? The Significance of C.P. Snow, (the Richmond Lecture, with an Essay on Sir Charles Snow's Rede Lecture by Michael Yudkin), London: Chatto & Windus.
 Jürgen Habermas, The Structural Transformation of the Public Sphere (1962)
 Alfred Schmidt, The Concept of Nature in Marx (1962)
 Rachel Carson, Silent Spring (1962)
 J. L. Austin, Sense and Sensibilia (published posthumously in 1962)
 Marshall McLuhan, The Gutenberg Galaxy (1962)
 Milton Friedman, Capitalism and Freedom (1962)
 Wolfhart Pannenberg, What Is Man? (1962)

Births
 January 17 - Nick Land
 February 26 - Andreas Kinneging
 April 5 - Roel Kuiper
 April 24 - Keith DeRose, American philosopher and academic
 April 26 - Algis Uždavinys (died 2010)
 May 3 - Anselm Jappe
 June 16 - Jon Oberlander
 August 13 - Leonidas Donskis (died 2016)
 Lewis Gordon
 Lori Gruen
 Will Kymlicka
 Robin LePoidevin
 Timothy Madigan
 Pete Moore
 Dominique Moulon
 Stephen Mulhall
 Aref Ali Nayed
 Mark Rowlands
 Renata Salecl
 Sonu Shamdasani
 Mikael Stenmark
 Tridandi Swami
 Evan Thompson
 Nigel Warburton
 Tasos Zembylas

Deaths

 January 20 - Robinson Jeffers, 75
 January 31 - Stefan Błachowski, 72
 February 14 - Kurt Singer, 75
 February 24 - Hu Shih, 70, Chinese philosopher, essayist and diplomat
 April 19 - Jacques Chevalier, 80
 April 29 - Hajime Tanabe
 May 11 - Arthur Edward Murphy, 60
 June 24 - William Mitchell (philosopher), 101
 July 6 - John Anderson, 68, Scottish-born Australian philosopher and academic
 July 9 - Georges Bataille, 64
 July 25 - Anastasio Cuschieri, 90
 October 9 - Milan Vidmar, 77
 October 16 - Gaston Bachelard, 78
 November 2 - George Barton Cutten, 88
 November 18 - Niels Bohr, 77
 December 1 - Henri Wallon (psychologist), 83
 December 27 - Serge Raynaud de la Ferriere, 46, French religious philosopher
 Gerardus Johannes Geers
 Francesc Pujols
 Francisco Romero (philosopher)

Philosophy
20th-century philosophy
Philosophy by year